The  is a DC electric multiple unit (EMU) train type operated by East Japan Railway Company (JR East) on local services in the Niigata area since 6 December 2014.

Design
Built at the J-TREC factory in Niitsu, Niigata, the stainless steel body and "universal design" interior is derived from the E233 series commuter EMU.

Operations

E129 series trains operate on the following lines, completely replacing older 115 series sets by around 2017.
 Joetsu Line ( – )
 Shinetsu Main Line ( – )
 Uetsu Main Line ( – )
 Hakushin Line ( – )
 Echigo Line ( – )
 Yahiko Line ( – )

The E129 series trains can operated in multiple, to form 2+2, 2+4, and 2+2+2 formations, but do not operate in multiple with E127 series trains except in emergencies.

Fleet
 the E129 series fleet consists of 34 two-car sets (68 vehicles) numbered A1 to A34 and 27 four-car sets (108 vehicles) numbered B1 to B27.> All sets are based at Niigata Depot.

Formations

2-car sets A1-A32
The two-car sets, A1 to A32, consist of two motored cars, each with one powered bogie, and are formed as shown below.

 The KuMoHa E129-100 car is fitted with a PS33G single-arm pantograph (cars KuMoHa E129-123 to KuMoHa E129-130 have two pantographs, and weigh 37.4 t).
 The KuMoHa E128-100 car has a universal access toilet.

4-car sets B1-B26
The four-car sets, B1 to B26, consist of four motored cars, each with one powered bogie, and are formed as shown below.

 The KuMoHa E129 and MoHa E129 cars are each fitted with one PS33G single-arm pantograph.
 The KuMoHa E128 car has a universal access toilet.

Interior
Passenger accommodation consists of a mix of transverse seating bays and longitudinal bench seating. LED lighting is used throughout.

History
Initial details of the new trains were announced by JR East in July 2013. The first two two-car sets, A1 and A2, were delivered on 8 October 2014, with test-running commencing the same day.

The first trains entered revenue service on 6 December 2014.

Fleet details
, the fleet is as follows.

2-car sets

4-car sets

Derivatives
Delivery of three two-car  sets from J-TREC in Niitsu began in March 2020. They are derived from the E129 series and are scheduled to replace the 115 series currently operated by Shinano Railway. These trains were put into service of rapid trains operated by Shinano Railway starting from 4 July 2020.

References

External links

 JR East E129 series 

Electric multiple units of Japan
East Japan Railway Company
J-TREC multiple units
Train-related introductions in 2014
1500 V DC multiple units of Japan